The Estádio Governador João Castelo, also known as the Castelão, is a multi-purpose stadium inaugurated on March 9, 1975, in São Luís, Maranhão, Brazil, with a maximum capacity of 40,000 people in a three-tier configuration. The stadium is owned by the Maranhão state Government, and is the home ground of Sampaio Corrêa Futebol Clube, Moto Club and Maranhão. Its formal name honors João Castelo Ribeiro Gonçalves (1937–2016), Maranhão governor from 1979 to 1982.

History

Castelão was completed in 1982 and was inaugurated on February 5 of that year, when the Brazil national team beat the Portugal national team 3–1. The first goal of the stadium was scored by Brazil's Júnior.

The stadium's attendance record currently stands at 97,720, set on September 24. 1998, when Santos beat Sampaio Corrêa 5–1. This Copa CONMEBOL match broke the previously attendance record, which was 95,000 people (Moto Club 3-1 Sampaio Corrêa, played in 1987).

References

Enciclopédia do Futebol Brasileiro, Volume 2 - Lance, Rio de Janeiro: Aretê Editorial S/A, 2001.

External links
Templos do Futebol

Football venues in Maranhão
Sports venues in Maranhão
Multi-purpose stadiums in Brazil
Maranhão Atlético Clube
Sampaio Corrêa Futebol Clube
Moto Club de São Luís